Allen Eugene Rusk (February 6, 1825 – March 12, 1904) was a member of the Wisconsin State Assembly.

Biography
Rusk was born on February 6, 1825, in Clayton Township, Perry County, Ohio. He settled in what is now Liberty, Wisconsin, in 1855. During the American Civil War, he served with the 42nd Wisconsin Volunteer Infantry Regiment of the Union Army. He was the brother of Jeremiah McLain Rusk. He died in Viroqua, Wisconsin, on March 12, 1905, one day after his wife Mary Newton Rusk (1818–1904).

Political career
Rusk was a member of the Assembly in 1878 and 1881. Additionally, he was Chairman of the Town Board (similar to city council) of Liberty, Wisconsin. He was a Republican.

Legacy
The town of Liberty, Wisconsin was formerly named "Rusk Corners" after Rusk.

References

External links

People from Perry County, Ohio
People from Vernon County, Wisconsin
Republican Party members of the Wisconsin State Assembly
Wisconsin city council members
People of Wisconsin in the American Civil War
Union Army soldiers
1825 births
1904 deaths
19th-century American politicians